Jimmy the Greek is a quick service restaurant franchise serving Greek and Mediterranean cuisine. In 1963, Jim Antonopoulos from Nafplio, Greece, arrived in Toronto, Ontario, Canada. He started the Epikourion, Exquisite Greek Restaurant & Bar in First Canadian Place of the busy Bay Street district of Toronto. The success of the restaurant spun off the current franchise which now has 55 locations across Canada in Alberta, British Columbia and Ontario, including more than 25 in the Greater Toronto Area. There are also locations in Dubai, UAE. Its outlets are almost exclusively located in the food courts of suburban shopping malls. Their menu offers a variety of Greek plates, including Chicken and pork Souvlaki, Schnitzel, lamb dishes, Calamari, Moussaka and more. They also offer pitas stuffed with different items, traditional Greek style. Additionally, they provide catering services for large parties.

See also
 List of Greek restaurants

References

External links
Jimmy The Greek Group

Fast-food chains of Canada
Restaurants established in 1985
Greek restaurants
Fast casual restaurants
Companies based in Toronto
1985 establishments in Ontario